yA Bank is a Norwegian bank offering basic banking and financial services to personal customers.

Information 
Established in 2006 and with headquarters in Oslo, Norway, yA Bank has over 100,000 customers.

yA Bank, a limited company (aksjeselskap or AS), is owned by yA Holding, a public limited company (allmennaksjeselskap or ASA), where shareholders include Norwegian and foreign institutional investors, funds, and banks. Kistefos AS is the largest shareholder. yA Holding is traded over the counter on the NOTC A-list of The Norwegian Securities Dealers Association.

yA Bank is a member of the Norwegian Banks' Guarantee Fund.

On November 30, 2018, yA Bank merged with Resurs Bank AB.

References

Website 
 yA.no

Banks of Norway
Banks established in 2006
Companies based in Oslo
Norwegian brands
Norwegian companies established in 2006